Donald Jahraus (July 13, 1892 – April 3, 1963) was an American special effects artist. He won an Academy Award for Best Special Effects and was nominated for two more in the same category.

Selected filmography
Jahraus won an Academy Award for Best Special Effects and was nominated for two more:

Won
 Thirty Seconds Over Tokyo (1944)

Nominated
 Stand By for Action (1942)
 They Were Expendable (1945)

References

External links

1892 births
1963 deaths
Special effects people
Best Visual Effects Academy Award winners
Artists from Salt Lake City